The Central District of Babol County is a district (bakhsh) in Babol County, Mazandaran Province, Iran. At the 2006 census, its population was 287,006, in 79,368 families.  The District has two cities: Babol and Amirkola. The District has three rural districts (dehestan): Esbu Kola Rural District, Feyziyeh Rural District, and Ganjafruz Rural District.

References 

Babol County
Districts of Mazandaran Province